LBMC Family of Companies is a Tennessee-based accounting, business advisory and professional services firm. The LBMC organization began in 1984 with the formation of the CPA firm.

LBMC now employs more than 500 employees across three Tennessee offices in Nashville, Knoxville, and Chattanooga. The headquarters is located in Brentwood, a suburb of Nashville located in Williamson County, Tennessee.

LBMC is a founding member of Leading Edge Alliance, an international alliance of independently owned accounting and business advisory service firms.

In  2005 LBMC Acquired Knoxville-based IT Solutions, merged with McWilliams & Company in 2006 and then merged with Petty & Landis (P&L) in Chattanooga in 2007.

References 

Accounting firms of the United States
Privately held companies based in Tennessee